Susan Cookson (born 20 April 1965) is an English actress. She has appeared in various television series, and is known for roles including as Tanya in Early Doors, Janice Piper in Clocking Off, Maggie Coldwell in the BBC medical drama Casualty and Wendy Posner in the ITV soap opera Emmerdale.

Career
Cookson portrayed the role of Maggie Coldwell on the BBC medical drama Casualty from 2005 to 2009 (this was Cookson's second role on the programme after appearing as recurring character Julie Day. She returned in March 2015 for one episode. She also appeared in the BBC soap opera Doctors as Kath Wylie for three episodes in 2009. Since 2019, Cookson has portrayed the regular role of Wendy Posner in the ITV soap opera Emmerdale.

Selected roles
 Casualty - Julie Day (1998–2000); Maggie Coldwell (2005–2009, 2015)
 Early Doors - Tanya (2003–2004)
 Bodies - Yvonne Matthews (2004)
 Emmerdale - D.C. Fallon (1997); DI Judy Dove (2002–03); Wendy Posner (2019–present)
 Shipman - DC Marie Snitynski (2002)
 Fat Friends - Lynette Pickering (2000)
 Clocking Off - Janice Piper
 Queer as Folk - Marcie Finch
 Land Girls - Esther Reeves (2009)
 Moving On - Barbara (2009)
 Waterloo Road - Maria Lucas (2010)
 Mount Pleasant - Jenny (2012)
 Last Tango in Halifax - Yvonne (2013)
 Miracle Babies (TV documentary) - narrator (2014)
 Coronation Street - Marion Logan (2015–2016)

Awards
Cookson won "Fave Female" of Series 21 of Casualty in the 2007 Holby TV awards. Her character Maggie Coldwell won "Favourites" in four categories for Series 22 (Female, All-Time Female, Character Most Want to Return, and Best Couple) at the 2008 Holby TV Awards.

References

External links
 

1965 births
Living people
English television actresses
Actresses from Manchester
English soap opera actresses